van Tricht is a Dutch surname. Notable people with the surname include:

Aert van Tricht, Dutch sculptor
Käte van Tricht (1909–1996), German musician
Wannes Van Tricht (born 1993), Belgian footballer

Surnames of Dutch origin